Arthur Storch (June 29, 1925 — March 25, 2013) was an American actor and Broadway director. A life member of The Actors Studio, Storch founded Syracuse Stage in 1974. Productions Storch directed included:
Tribute, on Broadway
The Comedy of Errors, at Syracuse Stage
Paradise is Closing Down, at Syracuse Stage

Storch also played the psychiatrist in the 1973 horror film The Exorcist. His other films include The Strange One (1957), The Mugger (1958) and Girl of the Night (1960).

Death 
Storch died from natural causes in the morning of March 25, 2013, aged 87. His death was announced by his son, Max.

Filmography

References

External links

Arthur Storch at the Internet Off-Broadway Database

1925 births
2013 deaths
American male film actors
American theatre directors
The New School faculty